Hans Korte (8 April 1929 – 25 September 2016) was a German actor.

Filmography
 Yesterday Girl (1966), as The Judge
 Die Weibchen (1970), as Kommissar
 Nachbarn sind zum Ärgern da (1970), as Max Hirnbiss
 The Captain (1971), as Herbert Prittel, purser
 Betragen ungenügend! (1972), as Prof. Heinzerling
 Don't Get Angry (1972), as Paul Wegmann
 Only the Wind Knows the Answer (1974), as Notar Ribeyrolles (voice, uncredited)
 Everyone Dies Alone (1976), as SS Obergruppenführer Prall
 Death is My Trade (1977), as Heinrich Himmler
 Derrick (1976-1993, TV Series), as Röder / Anwalt / Dr. Trabuhr / Robert Linder / Professor Balthaus / Herr Kwien / Ewald Malenke
 Doctor Faustus (1982), as Professor Kumpf
 Der Vater eines Mörders (1985, TV Movie, based on The Father of a Murderer), as The father of Heinrich Himmler
 Der Schatz im Niemandsland (1987, TV Series), as Grandfather Erfan
  (1988, TV Series), as Guy Lorentz
 Spider's Web (1989), as Hugenberg
  (1991, TV Movie), as Professor Erich Schumann
  (1991), as Dr. Dörner
  (1993, TV Mini-Series), as Max Reuther
 Katrin ist die Beste (1997, TV Series), as Friedrich
  (1998, TV Series), as Walter 'Fett-Daumen' Graf
 Samt und Seide (2002–2005, TV series), as August Meyerbeer

External links

Agency Doris Mattes 

1929 births
2016 deaths
German male television actors
German male film actors
20th-century German male actors
21st-century German male actors
People from Bochum
German male stage actors